Palmira is a corregimiento in Las Tablas District, Los Santos Province, Panama.

Demographics 
Its population as of 2010 was 93. Its population in 1990 was 89 and in 2000 it was 71.

References

Corregimientos of Los Santos Province